is a nationally designated Place of Scenic Beauty in the city of Semboku, Akita Prefecture, Japan.

Overview
The Hinokinai River is a 33 kilometer long tributary of the Tanaga River, and flows through the Kakunodate neighborhood of the city of Semboku. The two kilometers of the river embankments were planted with hundreds of Somei Yoshino sakura trees in 1934 in commemoration of the birth of Emperor Heisei.  Along with Kakunodate's famous samurai residence neighborhood, the cherry blossoms in spring are a major tourist attraction of the prefecture and in 1990 were selected as one of the "100 Best Cherry Blossom Spots in Japan" by the semi-governmental "Japan Sakura Association"

Gallery

See also
 List of Places of Scenic Beauty of Japan (Akita)

References

External links

 Semboku City site 

Gardens in Akita Prefecture
Places of Scenic Beauty
Semboku, Akita
Hanami spots of Japan